Larry Walker (born October 22, 1935) is an American visual artist and professor emeritus of art. He often uses mixed media collages that represent "urban surfaces" on the subjects of existentialism and social injustice. Walker currently lives and works in Stonecrest, Georgia and has taught at University of the Pacific and Georgia State University.

Early life
Walker was born in Franklin, Georgia, on October 22, 1935. In 1941, several years after his father's passing, Walker's family moved to Harlem where he was inspired by the urban life around him. Walker mentions people-watching from his apartment building's sixth story fire escape, experiences taking the train as a southerner in a large city, and his 145th street community as some of the major inspirations behind his work.

Career
Walker graduated from the High School of Music & Art (now Fiorello H. LaGuardia High School), and relocated to Detroit to attend Wayne State University, where he received both his B.S. in Art Education and M.A. in Drawing and Painting. In 1964, Walker began teaching at the University of the Pacific in Stockton, California where he was a professor and later made chair of the art department. In 1983 he and his family moved to Atlanta, Georgia and he took a position as a professor and director of the art program at Georgia State University, where he taught until his retirement in 2000. He is currently represented by Mason Fine Art in Atlanta, Georgia.

Artwork

In 2016, for his 80th birthday, his daughter Kara collaborated with Sikkema Jenkins, her representing gallery, for a solo exhibition for her father displaying works from over 50 years. “There’s a daughterly intention to understand connections that I lived around and reacted against,” she told the New York Times. The exhibition featured 38 works from Larry Walker's career, depicting the duress endured by human bodies and landscapes over time. His works are a part of the collections of the High Museum of Art, the Studio Museum in Harlem, the Philadelphia Museum of Art, and the Los Angeles County Museum of Art. Walker also has works that are in the Museum of Contemporary Art of Georgia's permanent collection  where he held a two-part retrospective exhibition in 2018. Walker's work is also included in the 2020 State of the Art exhibition with Crystal Bridges Museum of American Art as well as a solo exhibition with the Marietta/Cobb Museum of Art in September 2020.

Personal life
Walker has been married to his wife, Gwen, since 1958. They have three children; Dana, Larry Jr., and Kara. He currently lives and works from his home studio in Stonecrest, Georgia.

References 

1935 births
Living people
American artists
African-American artists
Wayne State University alumni
21st-century African-American people
20th-century African-American people